Caladenia angustata, commonly known as white caps is a species of orchid endemic to Tasmania. It has a single, hairy leaf and one or two white to pinkish flowers which are reddish or greenish on their backs. It has not been accepted as a separate species by some authorities who regard it as a synonym of Caladenia gracilis.

Description 
Caladenia angustata is a terrestrial, perennial, deciduous, herb with an underground tuber and which usually grows in loose groups. The back surface of the sepals and petal is a covered with reddish or greenish-brown glands. Flowering occurs from October to November. This orchid is similar to C. gracilis but can be distinguished by its very narrow leaf, different flower colour, smaller, more widely spaced calli and narrower column.

Taxonomy and naming 
Caladenia angustata was first described in 1810 by John Lindley and the description was published in Prodromus Florae Novae Hollandiae. The specific epithet (angustata) is a Latin word meaning "narrowed".

Caladenia angustata is regarded as a synonym of Caladenia gracilis by the Royal Botanic Gardens, Kew.

Australian authorities list Caladenia longii as a synonym of C. angustata.

Distribution and habitat 
White caps occurs in northern parts of Tasmania where it grows in forest on low hills with a shrubby understorey.

References 

angustata
Endemic orchids of Australia
Orchids of Tasmania
Plants described in 1840
Taxa named by John Lindley